Sutton Farm is a suburb on the south-east side of Shrewsbury, Shropshire, England.

History and topography
Prior to becoming a possession of Shrewsbury Abbey, the manor of Sutton was recorded in the Domesday Book as belonging to Wenlock Priory.

Sutton Farm is in the Anglican Parish of St. Giles' Church, where there was once a leper hospital for the Shrewsbury Abbey. Some 200m further along the Wenlock Road is Armoury Gardens, site where the former militia Armoury stood until it was removed brick by brick to a new site close to the Welsh Bridge.

It is connected to the suburbs of Abbey Foregate and Belvidere. Between these suburbs is Lord Hill's Column, the tallest free-standing Doric column in the world. Next to the Column are the modern Shirehall and Crown Court buildings.

In the heart of Sutton Farm is the Mere.  This is an open green space with a large lake at the centre.  It is said that monks from St. Giles church used to lead lepers to the Mere to bathe, as it was believed the waters had healing properties.

On the edge of Sutton Farm, on entering Shrewsbury from Much Wenlock, is Weeping Cross roundabout.  (There is also another Mere here, down a steep slope). This again dates back to mediaeval times, and is where the poor in the surrounding countryside left their dead for the monks to give a Christian burial.

Not far down the road that skirts Sutton Farm, almost opposite Percy Thrower’s Garden Centre, is a mediaeval chapel at Sutton, now used as Shrewsbury Greek Orthodox Church, dedicated to the Holy Fathers.  This is a very ancient church, and archaeology suggests it was probably pre-dated by earlier stone and wooden churches, and the site could even date back to early Christianity in this part of the country, to a time when people were moving out of the old Roman city of Viroconium (at the present day village of Wroxeter), which is only  from Shrewsbury.

On the western edge of Sutton Farm lies the Rea Brook Valley, which follows the course of the Rea Brook from the Meole Brace roundabout until it approaches the Abbey and River Severn, of which it is a tributary.  Here are found the remains of a long mill race and levelling ponds built by the monks, who had water mills situated in the valley.  Until more recent times, the former site of Salop Laundry (now replaced with new houses), was known by locals as the "mill" and is believed to be a site of one of the mills. Along the mill race towards Lord Hill's Column are some old bridges and ancient bridge embankments, one of which is called "Leper's Bridge", and is said to be where the monks led the lepers up to St. Giles Church which is at the top of the hill.

Housing
The majority of Sutton Farm is a housing estate built in the 1960s, but much older properties existed nearer the Column, and towards the Mere.
The original "Sutton Farm" was located where the current shops and Darwin pub (named after Charles Darwin, who was born and grew up in Shrewsbury) now are.

Education
The Mereside School (a junior school; formerly called Holy Cross) and the Springfield School (an infant school) are located on a site in the Springfield area. The suburb is home to Shrewsbury College of Arts and Technology campus on London Road.

Sport
Shrewsbury Town Football Club played 47 times in 2 seasons in Sutton Lane between 1893-95. This ground is now allotments. In 2007 Shrewsbury Town returned to Sutton Farm area at the South-West end of Oteley Road to establish their New Meadow stadium. This is bordering the adjacent area of Meole Brace next to Marches Railway Line Manchester to Cardiff.

Notable residents
Ernie Bowdler (1872-1921), Wales soccer international, was living at Villa Nova, Sutton Road, when he died.

References

Suburbs of Shrewsbury